The European Open is a PDGA-sanctioned major disc golf tournament held in Nokia, Finland. The first European Open was held in 2006 on the Epilä course, in Tampere. In 2011, the tournament was relocated to Nokia, 15 kilometres outside Tampere. The reigning champions are Eagle McMahon in the open division and Paige Pierce in the female division, both of whom are from the United States.

Winners

Prize money

References

External links 

 

Disc golf tournaments
Sports competitions in Finland
Recurring sporting events established in 2006